David Hickman may refer to:

David Hickman (musician), trumpet player, past president of International Trumpet Guild
David Henry Hickman (1821–1869), legislator and businessman from Columbia, Missouri
David Hickman (producer), English film producer and director
David Emanuel Hickman (1988–2011), last American soldier killed in the Iraq War

See also
David Henry Hickman High School, Columbia, Missouri